William Patrick "Willie P." Bennett (26 October 1951 – 15 February 2008) was a Canadian folk-music singer-songwriter, harmonica player, and mandolinist. Bennett was part of the 1970s folk music scene in Canada, and wrote and recorded many original songs. As well as performing as a solo artist, he was part of several well-known Ontario bands.

Life and career
Born in Toronto, Bennett was first recorded by folksinger David Wiffen, who released a cover of "White Lines" in 1973. Bennett released his first album, including his own recording of the song, the following year.

As solo performer, he recorded seven albums. Early in his career, he also formed and fronted a newgrass group, the Bone China Band, touring through Ontario.

Throughout his career, Bennett kept busy as a sideman in bands fronted by other artists. From 1974 to 1979 he toured and recorded with the Dixie Flyers, playing harmonica, while continuing to perform as a solo artist. In the early 1990s, Bennett was a member of Toronto-based Pat Temple's band, the High Lonesome Players, playing live and appearing on their albums. In 1991 he joined Fred Eaglesmith's band, the Flying Squirrels, with whom he toured and recorded, playing chiefly mandolin and harmonica and singing backup vocals, also serving as road manager, until shortly before his death.

Bennett also played harmonica live and on recordings with Joe Hall, Doug McArthur, Sneezy Waters and many other country and folk artists.

Bennett co-wrote the song "Goodbye, So Long, Hello" with Russell deCarle. The song was recorded by deCarle's band Prairie Oyster, released as a single in 1990.

Bennett returned to prominence in 1996, when Stephen Fearing, Colin Linden and Tom Wilson formed Blackie and the Rodeo Kings, a supergroup named for Bennett's 1978 album, and recorded a tribute album featuring Bennett's songs. Bennett's first subsequent album of new material, Heartstrings, won a 1999 Juno Award for Best Roots and Traditional Album – Solo.

During a 2007 Victoria Day weekend concert in Midland, Ontario, Bennett suffered an on-stage heart attack; he continued playing to the end of the concert, but after that was forced to stop touring.

He died of another heart attack on 15 February 2008, at his home in Peterborough, Ontario. At the time of his death, he was recording an album and was planning on rejoining Fred Eaglesmith on tour. His sister inherited his music rights.

Tributes

David Essig, producer of Bennett's first three albums, paid tribute to him in the song "Willie P", released on the 2009 album Double Vision (with Rick Scott). Canadian country singer Corb Lund wrote a song for Bennett on his 2009 album Losin' Lately Gambler, entitled "It's Hard to Keep a White Shirt Clean". Canadian songwriter Ian Tamblyn's 2009 album Gyre included a song he wrote for Willie called "Hurricane Heart". Americana songwriter Kenny Butterill wrote a song for Willie, "Wille We Miss Ya", released on his 2014 release Troubadour Tales.

In 2010, Bennett was inducted into the Canadian Country Music Association's Canadian Country Music Hall of Honour during the Canadian Country Music Awards. The award was accepted by his mother, sister and nephew.

The annual Fred Eaglesmith Charity Picnic in Aylmer, Ontario has hosted an annual Willie P. Bennett Memorial Hangover Run every year since 2010.

In 2014, the "Willie P. Bennett Legacy Project" was launched online, providing a space to share stories and new versions of Bennett's songs and to start a memorial award in his honour.

Awards

 1990 Canadian Country Music Association – Song of the Year, for "Goodbye, So Long, Hello" (co-written with Russell deCarle)
 1998 SOCAN – Song of the Year: Most Played Country Songs of 1997, for "One Way Track" (co-written with Russell deCarle)
 1999 Juno Award – Best Solo Roots And Traditional Album, for Heartstrings
 2010 Canadian Country Music Hall of Fame – Inducted as Artist

Discography

Singles

Albums

Compilations

With The Dixie Flyers

Willie was a full time member of this bluegrass band, playing on harmonica what would generally be considered the fiddle part.

Pat Temple and the High Lonesome Players

Primarily on harmonica, but also mandolin and harmony vocals.

With Fred Eaglesmith

Willie played with Fred for 23 years, live & in the studio, playing acoustic & electric mandolin, harmonica, and singing backup & harmony. He was a full time member of Fred's backing band through various iterations and also worked as road manager.

Other contributions

Cover versions

See also

Canadian rock
Music of Canada

References

External links
 
Willie P. Bennett legacy project

1951 births
2008 deaths
Musicians from Toronto
Canadian folk guitarists
Canadian male guitarists
Canadian folk singer-songwriters
Canadian harmonica players
Canadian male singer-songwriters
Canadian country singer-songwriters
Juno Award for Roots & Traditional Album of the Year – Solo winners
Canadian bluegrass mandolinists
20th-century Canadian male singers
20th-century Canadian guitarists